Robert John Orr Barton (23 August 1944 – 4 December 2021) was a British businessman, who was chairman of Next plc and EasyJet.

Early life
Barton was born in August 1944, in Lahore during the British Raj.
He was educated at Gordonstoun, completed an MBA at University of Strathclyde, and was a chartered accountant.

Career
Barton became a member of the board of Next in 2002, deputy chairman in 2004 and chairman in 2006. He was the chairman of EasyJet and a non-executive director of SSP Group.

Barton was the chief executive of JIB Group, and chairman of Cable & Wireless, Catlin Group, Jardine Lloyd Thompson, Wellington Underwriting, and Brit plc, and a non-executive director of WH Smith and Hammerson.

Personal life
Barton lived in the UK. He was married to Anne. He died suddenly on 4 December 2021, at the age of 77.

References

1944 births
2021 deaths
People from Lahore
Alumni of the University of Strathclyde
British businesspeople
People educated at Gordonstoun